The 4th Infantry Division is a formation of the Hellenic Army. Founded in 1912 as an infantry division, it continues to exist today as a reserve and training formation, headquartered in Tripoli, Peloponnese.

History 
The division was established in 1912 at Nafplio, with Major General Konstantinos Moschopoulos as its first commander, and comprising the 8th, 9th and 11th Infantry Regiments. Moschopoulos commanded the division during the First Balkan War, where it fought in both the Macedonian and the Epirus fronts, as well as during the Second Balkan War against Bulgaria. After the Balkan Wars, the division (8th, 11th and 35th Regiments) returned to the Peloponnese under the newly formed II Army Corps.

The division participated in the Asia Minor Campaign, where it was almost destroyed in the Battle of Dumlupınar in August 1922, as it faced the brunt of the Turkish offensive. Reformed in Greece, it fought in the Albanian front during the Greco-Italian War and was disbanded after the German invasion of Greece in April 1941. The division was reformed after the war, and has remained at Tripoli ever since.

Organization 
 Division HQ Company (ΛΣ/IV ΜΠ), at Tripoli
 2/39 Evzone Regiment (2/39 ΣΕ), at Missolonghi
 11th Infantry Regiment (11ο ΣΠ), at Tripolis
 Communications Training Centre (ΚΕΔΒ), at Kalamata
 Engineers Training Centre (ΚΕΜΧ), at Nafplio
 Supply and Transport Training Centre (ΚΕΕΜ), at Sparti
 Telecommunications Technicians Training School, at Pyrgos
 Engineer Corps School, at Loutraki
 Technical Corps Training Centre (ΚΕΤΧ), at Patras

Infantry divisions of Greece
Tripoli, Greece
1912 establishments in Greece
Military units and formations of Greece in World War I
Military units and formations of Greece in the Greco-Italian War
Military units and formations established in 1912
Military units and formations of Greece in the Balkan Wars